Commonwealth High School is a public high school in Commonwealth, Quezon City and is one of the largest high schools in the city by student population.

Overview
Commonwealth High School (CHS) is a duly recognized national secondary school of the Division of City Schools in Quezon City. Since 1986, it has served at least four barangays, providing equal opportunities to quality education.

History
Its colorful history began on July 14, 1986, when the first and only secondary school in Barangay Commonwealth was inaugurated. It was a dream-come-true for the members of SAMA-SAMA, a non-government organization based in Commonwealth and Fr. Joel Tabora, then Parish priest of Kristong Hari Chapel. Classes were held in an improvised room or cubicles in the chapel with student population of over 800.

In March 1988 the school was moved to a temporary site- a part of Doña Juana Elementary School in Barangay Holy Spirit, Quezon City. The school was housed in a four-room pre-fabricated structure, built by the city government and in a two-room structure built through the assistance of the Chinese Chamber of Commerce.

On June 20, 1991, SFHS – Commonwealth Annex was finally transferred to a 1.7-hectare lot located at Ecols Street, Barangay Commonwealth, Quezon City.

In June 1995, the school gained its independence from its mother school and finally named Commonwealth High School. It was also then called Don Mariano Marcos High School.

As enrollment continued to dramatically rise, different administrators were assigned to handle the school namely Ms. Flor Sandoval, Dr. Consolacion C. Montano, Mrs. Edda M. Martires, Mr. Steveson Damo, Mr. Alfredo Dela Cruz, Mrs. Yolanda Espinas, Dr. Josefina Perlado, Dr. Cresencio Viernes, Dr. Sally Barcelona  and presently Commonwealth High School is under the leadership and management of Mrs. Sheridan Evangelista.

To date, the school has seen a number of changes and improvements in terms of physical facilities and is currently spearheading a number of laudable programs and projects.

References 

High schools in Metro Manila
Schools in Quezon City